Operation Noah is an ecumenical Christian charity, based in the UK, that campaigns exclusively on climate change. Trustees are cross-denominational, with members from the Catholic, Anglican and free churches. The charity is managed by the Chair (Isabel Carter) and Board, with a small number of support staff. It is funded through supporter donations and grants.

Operation Noah was founded in 2004 by Christian Ecology Link (CEL),  with its official launch in October that year.  It later became a joint project of CEL and the Environmental Issues Network of Churches Together in Britain and Ireland. It gained charitable status in 2010.

In October 2009, the then Archbishop of Canterbury, Rowan Williams, gave the Operation Noah Annual Lecture at Southwark Cathedral, speaking on 'The Climate Crisis: A Christian Response'.

In February 2012, Operation Noah launched The Ash Wednesday Declaration, a theological response to climate change. The document was signed by a number of church leaders including Rowan Williams.

In September 2013, Operation Noah launched Bright Now, a campaign for UK church disinvestment in fossil fuel companies. In November/December 2013, Operation Noah was a partner on the Fossil Free UK Tour along with People & Planet and 350.org.

References

External links
Operation Noah website
Bright Now website

Christian charities based in the United Kingdom
Climate change organisations based in the United Kingdom